Pal Gazulli or Paulus Gassulus (1405–1470) was an Albanian Catholic priest, scholar and diplomat under Skanderbeg service. After the death of Georgius Pelino in 1463, he became the personal ambassador of Skanderbeg in Republic of Venice. On 13 December 1463 he represented Skanderbeg at the Venetian Senate. His brother Gjon was also a diplomat of the League of Lezhë.

References

15th-century Albanian Roman Catholic priests
1470 deaths
Albanian diplomats
1405 births
Ambassadors to the Republic of Venice
Skanderbeg
Ragusan Albanians
Ragusan diplomats